Subashis Roy (born 29 November 1988) is a Bangladeshi bowler who represents Sylhet Division in first-class and list A cricket and the Chittagong Vikings franchise in the Bangladesh Premier League. He is a right-handed batsman and right-arm fast medium bowler.

Domestic career
Roy made his first-class debut for Sylhet Division on 10 November 2007 caught the eye a seven-wicket haul against Barisal Division. He was part of Bangladesh Under-19 squad for home series against Sri Lanka U-19s and his five-for in Fatullah helped Bangladesh win the series.

In November 2016, he was named in a 22-man preparatory squad to train in Australia, ahead of Bangladesh's tour to New Zealand.

In October 2018, he was named in the squad for the Khulna Titans team, following the draft for the 2018–19 Bangladesh Premier League.

International career
In December 2016 he was named in Bangladesh's One Day International (ODI) squad for their series against New Zealand. On 29 December 2016, he made his ODI debut at Nelson, in the second match of the same series. He made his Test debut for Bangladesh against New Zealand on 12 January 2017.

References

External links
 

1988 births
Living people
Bangladeshi Hindus
Bangladeshi cricketers
Bangladesh Test cricketers
Bangladesh One Day International cricketers
Sylhet Division cricketers
Sylhet Strikers cricketers
Khulna Tigers cricketers
Rangpur Division cricketers
Abahani Limited cricketers
Mohammedan Sporting Club cricketers
Sheikh Jamal Dhanmondi Club cricketers
Bangladesh North Zone cricketers
Bangladesh A cricketers
People from Sylhet
South Asian Games gold medalists for Bangladesh
South Asian Games medalists in cricket